The men's 10,000 metres event at the 1973 Summer Universiade was held at the Central Lenin Stadium in Moscow with the final on 16 August.

Results

References

Athletics at the 1973 Summer Universiade
1973